Deltaville is a small unincorporated community and census-designated place on the eastern tip of Middlesex County in the eastern part of the U.S. state of Virginia. It is known for being a vacation spot for those looking for sailing, fishing, and other activities associated with the water. The Middlesex County Board of Supervisors approved a resolution on October 2, 2012 supporting the efforts of the official naming, " Deltaville, The Boating Capital of the Chesapeake Bay." Approximately 500-800 full-time residents call Deltaville home; however, the town's  population swells to several thousand in the summer months. Deltaville is also home to numerous retirees. The Census Bureau defines Deltaville as a census-designated place (CDP) with a population of 1,119 as of 2010. The town developed around being a large boat building area, mostly for commercial bay watermen. However those days have passed and now the area is dotted with numerous marinas, boatyards, and marine related businesses.

Originally known as Sandy Bottom, the community decided to change the town name in 1909. The name Delta was proposed, because of the shape of the town, as it is bordered by the Rappahannock River to the North, the Piankatank River to the south, and the Chesapeake Bay to the east. There was a Delta, Virginia already in existence, so "ville" was tacked onto the end. The Deltaville ZIP code is 23043.

Deltaville has been home for over a half century to a semi-pro baseball team, the Deltas. The 1948 vintage Deltaville Ballpark is their home field. Other activities in the town include a town pool, tennis courts, basketball court, and playground, and a community center, all built and maintained by a volunteer Board of the Deltaville Community Association - a (501) (c) (3) organization.

The Deltaville Maritime Museum and Holly Point Nature Park, home to the Nationally registered historic buyboat, the F.D. Crockett, is located in Deltaville at 287 Jackson Creek Road. Situated on 36 acres crossing both the waters of Mill Creek and Jackson Creek Road, this water accessible park acts as a setting for the Museum, the multi-purpose events pavilion, outside exhibits and the waterfront performance area. Founded in 2002, the Museum and Park's mission is to preserve and present the history of Chesapeake Bay watermen, their workboats, fisheries, and methods.  The Museum and Park also host farmer's markets, plays, concerts, and Holiday events throughout the year.

The tip end of Deltaville is Stingray Point, named by Captain John Smith on July 17, 1608. According to Captain John Smith's The General History, "He was stung by a stingray there while exploring the bay. Captain Smith is said to have given orders for his men to dig a grave because he believed himself to be dying from the sting.  Walter Russell, a doctor of physic, and also a member of Smith's crew, applied a "precious oil" to Smith's wound. The Captain recovered sufficiently to eat the stingray for his dinner that evening. The legend that a cure was given to Smith by local Native Americans, who lived along what is now called Antipoison Creek, has been largely been discredited."

On the evening of April 16, 2011, the community was struck by a devastating tornado. Prior to reaching Deltaville the storm had torn a path from North Carolina to the Chesapeake Bay. With wind gust estimated 135 mph it only took minutes to cause approximately 6.8 million in damages. The tornado touched down near Porpoise Cove, on the south side of Deltaville, and ran a northeast path, destroying 32 homes, along with Zoar Baptist Church, the Community Association Pool, and severely damaged the community hall. Despite injuries, no one was killed.

The F.D. Crockett was listed on the National Register of Historic Places in 2012.

References

Sources
National Historic Registry Sign in Hartfield, Virginia, "A Portrait of Deltaville 25th Anniversary Edition"

External links

Deltaville Official Site - Home of the Deltaville Community Association
Southside Sentinel Local Newspaper
Lower Middlesex Volunteer Fire Department

Census-designated places in Middlesex County, Virginia
Unincorporated communities in Virginia
Census-designated places in Virginia
Virginia populated places on the Chesapeake Bay